The Taylor County Expo Center, formerly Taylor County Coliseum, is a 5,000-seat multi-purpose arena in Abilene, Texas. It was built in 1973.

The Expo Center is the former home of the Abilene Aviators, of the Western Professional Hockey League. In 2015, it was announced as the home venue for the Abilene Warriors of American Indoor Football for their inaugural 2016 season. However, prior to their first game, the lease was cancelled due to a "breach of contract" and the Warriors announced they would play their first game in Snyder, Texas.

References

External links
Taylor County Expo Center website

Indoor arenas in Texas
Indoor ice hockey venues in the United States
Sports venues in Abilene, Texas
1973 establishments in Texas
Sports venues completed in 1973